"If You Ever Change Your Mind" is a song written by Parker McGee and Bob Gundry, and recorded by American country music artist Crystal Gayle.  It was released in August 1980 as the first single from the album These Days.  The song was Gayle's eighth number one country hit.  The single stayed at number one for one week and spent a total of eighteen weeks on the chart, and also peaked at number eighteen on the Adult Contemporary chart.

Chart performance

References

1980 singles
Crystal Gayle songs
Song recordings produced by Allen Reynolds
Columbia Records singles
1980 songs
Songs written by Parker McGee